Lillian is the only collaborative studio album by Alias (Brendon Whitney) & Ehren (Ehren Whitney). It was released on Anticon in 2005. The album is named after their grandmother.

Critical reception
Marisa Brown of AllMusic gave the album 4 stars out of 5, saying: "There's never a climax or any kind of resolution; rather, it's just the fading in and out of ideas, but despite the fact that the formula becomes apparent after a few songs, nothing ever gets boring." She called it "a troubling, sweet record that's more than willing to immerse itself in abstraction and a lack of clarity, stimulating thought instead of giving distinct answers, which makes it quite a powerful accomplishment." Rachel Devitt of SF Weekly said: "With a benevolent, knowing touch, sponsors Alias and Ehren gently guide their wards into their new lives as functioning members of ambient, beat-driven hip hop."

Track listing

Personnel
Credits adapted from liner notes.

 Alias – guitar, sampler, keyboards, drum programming, production, arrangement, recording, mixing, photography
 Ehren – alto saxophone, soprano saxophone, flute, clarinet, keyboards, drum programming, photography
 Jeremy Goody – mastering
 Baillie Parker – executive production
 Roger Bacon – art direction

References

External links
 

2005 albums
Alias (musician) albums
Anticon albums